Zolt Balazs (born 14 January 1963) is a Romanian alpine skier. He competed in two events at the 1984 Winter Olympics.

References

1963 births
Living people
Romanian male alpine skiers
Olympic alpine skiers of Romania
Alpine skiers at the 1984 Winter Olympics
Sportspeople from Miercurea Ciuc